Conference on disarmament or disarmament conference may refer to:

 Conference for the Reduction and Limitation of Armaments (Geneva, 1932–1934)
 Conference on Disarmament, an international forum to negotiate multilateral arms control and disarmament agreements established in 1979
 Conference of the Committee on Disarmament

See also 
 Arms control